These are the Oricon number one albums of 1995, per the Oricon Albums Chart.

Chart history

References

1995 record charts
Lists of number-one albums in Japan
1995 in Japanese music